Frederick Steven Couples (born October 3, 1959) is an American professional golfer who has competed on the PGA Tour and the PGA Tour Champions. A former World No. 1, he has won 64 professional tournaments, most notably the Masters Tournament  and the Players Championship in 1984 

In August 2011, he won his first senior major at the Senior Players Championship and followed this up in July 2012 when he won the Senior Open Championship. He was inducted into the World Golf Hall of Fame in 2013. Couples garnered the nickname "Boom Boom" for his long, accurate driving ability off the tee during the prime of his career.

Early years and education
Couples was born in Seattle, Washington, to Tom and Violet (née Sobich) Couples. His paternal grandparents immigrated from Italy and changed the family name from "Coppola" to "Couples" to make it sound less ethnic, and his mother was of Croatian descent.

His father was a groundskeeper for the Seattle Parks Department and the family, which included brother Tom Jr. and sister Cindy, lived in a modest house on Beacon Hill near the city's Jefferson Park golf course, where Couples developed his signature loose, rhythmic swing in order to gain enough distance to keep up with the older children. Couples admitted to being self-taught, never taking a lesson and never hiring a swing coach.

Couples attended O'Dea High School in Seattle and graduated in 1977. He accepted a golf scholarship to the University of Houston. As a member of the Houston Cougars men's golf team, he roomed with Blaine McCallister, another future PGA Tour player, and future CBS television broadcaster 

As a 19-year-old amateur, Couples beat PGA Tour veteran (and fellow Seattle native) Don Bies in a playoff to win the 1978 Washington Open at the Glendale Country Club in Bellevue.

Professional career

PGA Tour
Couples's first PGA Tour victory came at the Kemper Open in 1983 at Congressional Country Club in suburban Washington, D.C. Playing in the final group with Scott Simpson and Chen Tze-chung, the three finished over one hour after the previous group on the course. In spite of rounds of 77, 76, and 77, Couples, Simpson, and Chen finished tied for first along with Gil Morgan and Barry Jaeckel who had finished their rounds several hours earlier. Jaeckel, who spent time in a bar waiting for regulation play to conclude, was eliminated on the first playoff hole after hitting a wild tee shot. On the second hole, Couples scored a birdie to take home the title.

In addition to his Kemper Open win, Couples won another fourteen PGA Tour titles. Among them were two Players Championships (1984, 1996) and one major victory, the 1992 Masters Tournament.

Couples was named the PGA Tour Player of the Year twice, in 1991 and 1992. He also won the Vardon Trophy for lowest scoring average in each of those years. He has been named to the United States Ryder Cup team five times, in 1989, 1991, 1993, 1995 and 1997.

In 1992, Couples became the first American player to reach the number one position in the Official World Golf Rankings (since the World Ranking points system debuted in April 1986).  He spent 16 weeks at number 1, after one of the hottest ever starts to a season by a PGA Tour player. Beginning with the Nissan Los Angeles Open, where he defeated Davis Love III in a playoff, Couples won two tournaments and finished second in two others in the five weeks leading up to The Masters. At Augusta, Couples carried over his momentum, shooting in the 60s in each of the first three rounds to hold second place heading into Sunday. After a shaky start to his final round that allowed 49-year-old Raymond Floyd to claim the lead, Couples took it back with 18- and 20-foot birdie putts at the 8th and 9th holes, respectively, then saved par on a slick 6-footer at 10. At 12 (perhaps the scariest par-3 in the world), Couples barely cleared Rae's Creek in front of the green. Although his ball rolled back towards the water, it incredibly remained on the bank and he saved par. Sensing that destiny was on his side, Couples held off Floyd the rest of the way, completing Augusta's treacherous back nine with eight pars and one birdie to win his first Major. The win pushed Couples past the $1 million mark in earnings on the season as well, by far the fastest any player had reached that plateau.

Couples is sometimes called "Mr. Skins" because of his dominance in the Skins Game. He has won the event five times (in 1995, 1996, 1999, 2003, and 2004), accumulating over $3.5 million and 77 skins in 11 appearances. Because of his dominance at the Skins and other off-season events like the Johnnie Walker World Golf Championship, Couples is also known as the "King of the Silly Season," referring to the exotic made-for-TV events staged in the winter that are better known as the "silly season."

Couples was frequently accused of "choking" in his early career, with mistakes in the 1989 Ryder Cup and the 1990 PGA Championship at Shoal Creek Golf and Country Club often mentioned.

Couples has nine top-10 finishes in the Open Championship, including tying for third in 1991 at Royal Birkdale, shooting a last round 64, and again tying for third in 2005 at St Andrews. In addition to his The Open Championship success Couples played well in many other international tournaments. He won two prestigious European Tour events, the Dubai Desert Classic and the Johnnie Walker Classic, in back-to-back weeks in 1995. He also finished runner-up in three European Tour events in his career: the 1989 BMW International Open, the 1994 Johnnie Walker Classic, and the 1997 Heineken Classic. He also finished runner-up on the Australasian Tour's 1988 Johnnie Walker Australian Classic, Japan Golf Tour's prestigious 1993 Dunlop Phoenix Tournament, and the Asian Tour's 2005 SK Telecom Open.

Since March 1994, back injuries have affected Couples's career. His swing features an extreme shoulder turn at the top, which, combined with the fact that he keeps his left foot flat on the ground throughout the backswing, puts a lot of pressure on his lower back. However, with an abbreviated schedule, Couples is still one of the best players on Tour. In 2003, at age 44, Couples finished 34th on the PGA Tour money list. That year he also won the Shell Houston Open, his first win in five years; Couples wept with joy after the win, but quickly explained the tears, saying: "I'm always emotional when nice things happen to nice people."

In April 2006, Couples challenged at Augusta, making a Sunday run at what would have been his second green jacket before finally losing to eventual winner Phil Mickelson, with whom he was paired in the final round. Had Couples won, he would have been the oldest player ever to win the Masters at age —supplanting Jack Nicklaus, who, coincidentally, won his final Masters 20 years earlier and also at the age of 46. His competitiveness in the tournament was an encouraging sign for his career. "I didn't hit the ball like I was 46," Couples said.

Couples's part in the USA 1993 Dunhill Cup win included victory in all five of his matches, and his overall record reads: played 16, won 12, lost 4. In 2004, Couples won the Dunhill Links Championship Team Event at St Andrews, partnered by New Zealand amateur Craig Heatley.

In 2005 Couples sank a crucial putt in the Presidents Cup, securing an unlikely 1-up victory over the International team's best player, Vijay Singh. This match proved to be pivotal in the contest. Couples has now played Singh three times in Presidents Cup match play, and has yet to lose.

Couples was sidelined for virtually the entire 2007 season because of health problems. However, he did compete in the 2007 Masters, making the cut for the 23rd consecutive time, tying the record held by Gary Player. Couples missed the cut in 2008 and 2009.

In 2009, Couples limited his play but performed impressively at the Northern Trust Open. If it wasn't for Phil Mickelson shooting a 62 on that Saturday, Couples may have won instead of finishing third. He nearly won the Shell Houston Open but bogeyed the last three holes and finished third behind Paul Casey. He also played well at the HP Byron Nelson Championship (T8) and the AT&T National (T11) tournaments. He hurt his back practicing for the RBC Canadian Open and had to withdraw. But he rested and recovered and made the cut for the PGA Championship (T36) and performed successfully in the Wyndham Championship (T5) which put him past the $1 million mark on the money list for the 7th time in his career.

Couples was named as Presidents Cup captain for the 2009 United States team on February 26, 2008, and led the U.S. team to a decisive victory nineteen months later.

Couples and Jason Dufner were the 36-hole co-leaders at the Masters in 2012; at age 52, he was looking to become the oldest to win a major. He dropped back with 75 in the third round and finished tied for twelfth.

He is one of the few professional golfers who never plays with a glove.

PGA Tour Champions
Couples made his debut on the Champions Tour at the opening event of the 2010 season, the Mitsubishi Electric Championship in Hawaii. He nearly won the tournament, finishing second to Tom Watson. Despite the loss, Couples stated, "I had a wonderful time. I think I was 21 under par and didn't win a tournament. That hasn't happened too many times." Had he won, he would have become the 16th player to win his Champions Tour debut. He won his next three starts, The ACE Group Classic, the Toshiba Classic and the Cap Cana Championship, becoming the first player in Champions Tour history to win three of his first four career events. Couples made another run at the 2010 Masters Tournament but finished 6th. It was his 26th top ten finish in a major tournament.

He finished second in the 2010 Senior PGA Championship. Later in the same year he finished runner-up to Bernhard Langer in the U.S. Senior Open. Couples had a one-shot lead after 55 holes, but disaster struck on the par 5 2nd hole. He decided to lay up rather than going for the green. His lay-up shot was effective, but his 3rd shot landed in the water. After dropping 4, his 5th shot was driven over the green. He finished the hole with a triple bogey; his one-shot lead became a 3 shot deficit. He played solidly for the rest of the round, but could not catch up to Langer.

Couples earned a 4th win at the Administaff Small Business Classic. On Sunday, he was grouped with Corey Pavin and Mark Wiebe and soared past them and the rest of the field shooting a 9 under 63, with 29 on the back nine. Couples won the Champions Tour Rookie of the Year award in 2010.

Couples was sidelined once again for most of the 2011 season because of his stubborn back problems. But after receiving treatment in Germany, he was able to come back. He won his first major tournament on the senior circuit by defeating John Cook, on the third hole of a sudden death play-off, capturing the Senior Players Championship.

In July 2012, Couples won his second senior major championship when he won The Senior Open Championship at Turnberry. He came from a stroke back to win by two over Gary Hallberg. He made a 25-foot putt for birdie on the last hole to hold off Hallberg, for a round of three under 68 on Sunday. This was his eighth victory in total on the Champions Tour.

In 2016, Couples was forced to forgo the Masters Tournament for the first time since 1994, citing ongoing back problems, which have plagued him throughout his career.

Other ventures
Couples co-designs golf courses with his design partner, Gene D. Bates. This venture, beginning in 1992 has resulted in the formation of Couples Bates Golf Design firm (Now Bates Golf Design Group), and over 20 award-winning championship golf courses worldwide.

Couples currently takes the supplement Anatabloc and is a brand ambassador for the anti-inflammatory neutraceutical containing anatabine.  He wears the brand logo on his left arm of his golf shirts.

Couples has lent his name to two video games: Fred Couples Golf for the Game Gear, and Golf Magazine: 36 Great Holes Starring Fred Couples for the 32X, both published by Sega in 1994.

Personal life
Couples's marriage to his first wife Deborah ended in 1992. They had met as students at the University of Houston  The divorce was finalized in 1993, and she later jumped to her death in May 2001. The Los Angeles City coroner's office ruled it a suicide. Couples' estranged second wife, Thais Baker, died from breast cancer on February 17, 2009. They had married in 1998 and the union was childless. Couples married his long time girlfriend, Suzanne Hannemann, on February 22, 2022.

Couples currently resides in Newport Beach, California.

Couples, a self-proclaimed "Sports Junkie," is a member of the Seattle Seahawks 12th Man. He raised the 12th Man flag prior to the Seahawks Monday Night Football game against the New Orleans Saints on December 2, 2013.

Couples is good friends with Michael Jordan and named him one of his assistant coaches when he coached the President's Cup in 2011.

Awards
 Inducted into the National Italian-American Sports Hall of Fame in 2007.
 Inducted into the World Golf Hall of Fame in May 2013.
 Inaugurated in the Croatian-American Sports Hall of Fame in October 2022.

Professional wins (64)

PGA Tour wins (15)

*Note: The 1993 Honda Classic was shortened to 54 holes due to inclement weather.

PGA Tour playoff record (5–4)

European Tour wins (3)

Other wins (33)

Other playoff record (1–2)

PGA Tour Champions wins (14)

PGA Tour Champions playoff record (2–2)

Playoff record
PGA Tour of Australasia playoff record (0–1)

Major championships

Wins (1)

Results timeline
Results not in chronological order in 2020.

LA = Low amateur
CUT = missed the half-way cut
"T" indicates a tie for a place
NT = No tournament due to COVID-19 pandemic

Summary

Most consecutive cuts made – 13 (twice)
Longest streak of top-10s – 3 (twice)

The Players Championship

Wins (2)

Results timeline

CUT = missed the halfway cut
"T" indicates a tie for a place.

Results in World Golf Championships

1Cancelled due to 9/11

QF, R16, R32, R64 = Round in which player lost in match play
"T" = Tied
WD = Withdrew
NT = No tournament

Senior major championships

Wins (2)

Results timeline
Results not in chronological order before 2021.

DQ = disqualified
WD = withdrew
CUT = missed the half-way cut
"T" indicates a tie for a place
NT = No tournament due to COVID-19 pandemic

U.S. national team appearances
USA vs. Japan: 1984
Ryder Cup: 1989 (tie), 1991 (winners), 1993 (winners), 1995, 1997
Four Tours World Championship: 1990, 1991
Dunhill Cup: 1991, 1992, 1993 (winners), 1994
World Cup of Golf: 1992 (winners), 1993 (winners), 1994 (winners), 1995 (winners)
Presidents Cup: 1994 (winners), 1996 (winners), 1998, 2005 (winners), 2009 (non-playing captain, winners), 2011 (non-playing captain, winners), 2013 (non-playing captain, winners)
UBS Cup: 2004 (winners)
Wendy's 3-Tour Challenge (representing PGA Tour): 1992, 1994 (winners), 1996 (winners), 1997 (winners), 1998, 2001, 2004, 2005, 2009

See also
Fall 1980 PGA Tour Qualifying School graduates
List of golfers with most Champions Tour wins

References

External links

American male golfers
Houston Cougars men's golfers
PGA Tour golfers
PGA Tour Champions golfers
Ryder Cup competitors for the United States
Winners of men's major golf championships
Winners of senior major golf championships
World Golf Hall of Fame inductees
Golfers from Seattle
American people of Italian descent
American people of Croatian descent
1959 births
Living people